Neavitt is an unincorporated community in Talbot County, Maryland, United States. Neavitt is located at the southern terminus of Maryland Route 579 on the north bank of the Choptank River, south-southwest of St. Michaels and northeast of Tilghman Island.

References

Unincorporated communities in Talbot County, Maryland
Unincorporated communities in Maryland